Rușchița is a reddish, pinkish or white marble found in Romania. The marble deposit is located in the north of Caraș-Severin County, about 10 km northwest of the village of Rusca Montană, in the Poiana Rusca Mountains.

Rușchița marble mining was done in the shape of a turned-over bell between 1884 and 1960. Nowadays the extraction is made in descending horizontal slices.

References 

Economy of Romania
Building stone